LAE J095950.99+021219.1 is one of the most distant galaxies discovered as of yet, and has high scientific use, as it has revealed many important details of the early universe and emerging stars. LAE J095950.99+021219.1 is about 13 billion light years away and is among the most-distant known objects in the universe. It is a Lyman-alpha emitter.

Discovery 

LAE J095950.99+021219.1 was discovered in mid-2012. It was observed using the Magellan Telescopes at the Las Campanas Observatory in Chile.

Light 

LAE J095950.99+021219.1 is emitting light identified at redshift 6.944. It is 2-3 times fainter than other Lyman Alpha Galaxies

See also
List of the most distant astronomical objects

References

External links 
Astronomers discover faintest distant galaxy - Science Daily
A Lyα GALAXY AT REDSHIFT z = 6.944 IN THE COSMOS FIELD

Galaxies
Sextans (constellation)
Astronomical objects discovered in 2012